Mike Melvoin (May 10, 1937February 22, 2012) was an American jazz pianist, composer, and arranger. He served as chairman and president of  The Recording Academy and worked as a prolific studio musician, recording with Frank Sinatra, John Lennon, The Jackson 5, Natalie Cole, and The Beach Boys. Melvoin was nominated for the 2003 Grammy Award for Best Jazz Instrumental Solo for "All or Nothing at All" from his album It's Always You.

Biography
Melvoin was born in Oshkosh, Wisconsin, and began playing the piano at the age of three. He studied English at Dartmouth College, graduating in 1959, but decided to pursue a career in music. Melvoin, whose original family name was Mehlworm, was Jewish. After moving to Los Angeles in 1961, he played with Frank Rosolino, Leroy Vinnegar, Gerald Wilson, Paul Horn, Terry Gibbs, Joe Williams, Peggy Lee and others. He released his debut album as a bandleader, Keys to Your Mind, in 1966 on Liberty Records. Melvoin played in clubs in Los Angeles, and accompanied singer Bill Henderson and played with Herb Ellis and Plas Johnson on Concord Jazz releases.

Melvoin worked extensively as a studio musician and was part of The Wrecking Crew, performing on the Beach Boys' Pet Sounds (1966), Frank Sinatra's That's Life (1966), the Jackson 5's ABC (1970), John Lennon's "Stand by Me" (1975), Tom Waits' Nighthawks at the Diner (1975), and Barbra Streisand's "Evergreen (Love Theme from A Star Is Born)" (1976). He worked in the early 1970s as a music director on The Partridge Family recordings, often playing keyboard, and also began composing for film and television including contributing scores to Fame and MacGyver.

His children, Wendy (of Prince's band The Revolution, and later of Wendy & Lisa), Susannah and Jonathan all became professional musicians.

Melvoin was the first active musician to serve as the head of NARAS. When NARAS introduced category changes to the Grammys in 2011, he opposed them.

Melvoin died in Burbank, California, on February 22, 2012, of cancer, at age 74.

Discography

As leader
 Keys to Your Mind (Liberty, 1966)
 Between the Two (Liberty, 1968)
 The Plastic Cow Goes Moooooog (Dot, 1970)
 Redeye (Voss, 1988)
 The Capitol Sessions  (Naim, 1999)
 Oh Baby (City Light, 2002)
 It's Always You (City Light, 2003)
 Like Jazz  (City Light, 2003)
 Playing the Word (City Light, 2006)
 You Know (City Light, 2006)

As backing musician
With Judy Collins
 Who Knows Where the Time Goes (Elektra, 1968)
With Stan Getz
 Children of the World (Columbia, 1979)
With Thelma Houston
 I've Got the Music in Me (Sheffield Lab, 1975)
With Lucio Battisti
 Io tu noi tutti (Numero Uno, 1977)
With José Feliciano
 Souled (RCA Victor, 1968)
 10 to 23 (RCA Victor, 1969)
 And the Feeling's Good (RCA Victor, 1974)
 Ya Soy Tuyo (RCA International, 1985)
With Milt Jackson
 Memphis Jackson (Impulse!, 1969)
With Quincy Jones
 The Hot Rock OST (Prophesy, 1972)
With Peggy Lee
 I'm a Woman (Capitol Records, 1963)
 Mirrors (A&M Records, 1975)
With Helen Reddy
 Ear Candy (Capitol Records, 1977)
With Natalie Cole
 Unforgettable... with Love (Elektra Records, 1991)
 Take a Look (Elektra Records, 1993)
With Michael Bublé
 Michael Bublé (Reprise Records, 2003)
 Call Me Irresponsible (Reprise Records, 2007)
With Oliver Nelson
 Sound Pieces (Impulse, 1966)
With Johnny Rivers
 Last Boogie In Paris (live) (Atlantic Records, 1974)
 New Lovers and Old Friends (Epic Records, 1975)
 Wild Night (United Artists Records, 1976)
 Outside Help (Big Tree Records, 1977)
With Tim Buckley
 Look at the Fool (Rhino Records, 1974)
With Joe Pass
 Guitar Interludes (Discovery, 1969)
With Barbra Streisand
 The Movie Album (Columbia Records, 2003)
With Kenny Rogers
 Timepiece (Atlantic Records, 1994)
With Boz Scaggs
 Slow Dancer (Columbia Records, 1974)
With Rock Flowers
 Rock Flowers (Wheel/RCA, 1971)
 Naturally (Wheel/RCA, 1972)
With Barry Manilow
 Manilow Sings Sinatra (Arista Records, 1998)
With Donovan
 7-Tease (Epic Records, 1974)
With Lalo Schifrin
 Music from Mission: Impossible (Dot, 1967)
 More Mission: Impossible (Paramount, 1968)
 Mannix (Paramount, 1968)
 Bullitt (soundtrack) (Warner Bros., 1968)
 Rock Requiem (Verve, 1971)
 Gypsies (Tabu, 1978)
With Juice Newton
 Juice Newton & Silver Spur (RCA Victor, 1975)
With Bud Shank
 Bud Shank Plays Music from Today's Movies (World Pacific, 1967)
With Gábor Szabó
 Light My Fire (Impulse!, 1967) with Bob Thiele
 Wind, Sky and Diamonds (Impulse!, 1967)
 1969 (Skye, 1969)
With Leroy Vinnegar
 Leroy Walks Again!! (Contemporary, 1963)
 Jazz's Great Walker (Vee Jay, 1964)
With Tom Waits
 The Heart of Saturday Night (Asylum Records, 1974)
 Nighthawks_at_the_Diner (Asylum Records, 1975)
With Paul Anka
 The Music Man (United Artists Records, 1977)

Filmography
 The Main Event (1979) Composer
 The Good Shepherd (2006) - Piano Player

References

External links

1937 births
2012 deaths
People from Oshkosh, Wisconsin
American film score composers
American jazz pianists
American male pianists
American music arrangers
American session musicians
American television composers
Deaths from cancer in California
Dartmouth College alumni
Musicians from Wisconsin
Musicians from Los Angeles
20th-century American pianists
American rock keyboardists
20th-century American composers
Jewish American musicians
Jazz musicians from California
American male film score composers
20th-century American male musicians
American male jazz musicians
20th-century American keyboardists
21st-century American Jews